Ectropis fractaria is a moth of the family Geometridae. It is found in Australia, including Tasmania.

Boarmiini
Moths described in 1857